The Born-Alive Abortion Survivors Protection Act is a proposed United States law that would penalize healthcare practitioners who fail to provide care for an infant that is born-alive from an abortion attempt.

Background

Abortion is a contentious political issue in the United States. The abortion-rights movement which argues that a woman's right to privacy and bodily autonomy extends to the right to an abortion, is predominantly upheld by the Democratic Party. The anti-abortion movement, which argues that an embryo or fetus has rights that must be protected by law, is largely upheld by the Republican Party.

The anti-abortion movement has claimed that viable infants have been left to die following failed abortion procedures. On August 5, 2002, President George W. Bush signed into law the Born-Alive Infants Protection Act, which established that every infant who survives an abortion procedure is considered a person under federal law.

Following the reversal of federal abortion rights in Dobbs v. Jackson Women's Health Organization, the anti-abortion movement has called for federal legislation restricting abortion. Dobbs has been attributed to Republican underperformance in the 2022 midterm elections, so the advancement of such legislation is considered to be politically risky for the Republican Party.

Provisions
The bill requires that any infant born from an abortion attempt be given the same amount of care as any other infant born at same gestational age, such as in a preterm birth. Failure for a healthcare practitioner to do can be penalized with up to five years imprisonment under the bill. Violations of the law are required to be reported to a hospital or law enforcement. The bill also authorizes a right to civil action to the mother of which an infant had been neglected care.

Opponents of the bill have called its provisions unnecessary and misleading, with the criminal penalties having the potential to deter a doctor's best judgment.

Legislative history

See also
Born alive laws in the United States

References

Proposed legislation of the 118th United States Congress